Commissioner for Local Government and Chieftaincy Affairs  is an official of the Akwa Ibom State Government in Nigeria. The current commissioner is Rt. Hon Victor Etim Antai

References 

Government of Akwa Ibom State